Blanche Montel (14 August 1902 – 31 March 1998) was a French actress. She appeared in 33 films between 1914 and 1943.

External links

1902 births
1998 deaths
French film actresses
French silent film actresses
20th-century French actresses